Philip Pedlar (born 30 April 1899, date of death unknown) was a Welsh professional footballer who played as a full back.

References

1899 births
Year of death unknown
Footballers from Merthyr Tydfil
Welsh footballers
Association football defenders
Merthyr Town F.C. players
Chesterfield F.C. players
Burnley F.C. players
English Football League players
Ebbw Vale F.C. players